is a passenger railway station in located in the city of  Hirakata, Osaka Prefecture, Japan, operated by the private railway company Keihan Electric Railway.

Lines
Makino Station is served by the  Keihan Main Line, and is located 25.5 km from the starting point of the line at Yodoyabashi Station.

Station layout
The station has two elevated island platforms with the station building underneath.

Platforms

Adjacent stations

Starting only: Semi-Express (区間急行)
Terminating only: Midnight Express (深夜急行) (arriving at 0:50 a.m.)

History
The station was opened on April 15, 1910.

Passenger statistics
In fiscal 2019, the station was used by an average of 23,327 passengers daily.

Surrounding area
Osaka Dental University 
Makino Park
Kansai Medical University

See also 
List of railway stations in Japan

References

External links

Official home page 

Railway stations in Osaka Prefecture
Railway stations in Japan opened in 1910
Hirakata, Osaka